The Wheeltappers and Shunters Social Club was a British television variety show produced by Granada Television from 1974 to 1977. It was set in a fictional working men's club in the North of England and was hosted by comedian Colin Crompton as the club's chairman. The show's compere was usually Bernard Manning, who as well as telling jokes and introducing acts often finished the show with a song. Crompton was frequently the butt of his jokes, acting as Manning's stooge.

The set was arranged like a club, so that, rather than being arranged in terraced seating the studio audience would be seated around tables and be served beer and snacks, join in a singalong and otherwise engage in audience participation.

Crompton, as chairman of the club, would sit at a small table in the corner watching proceedings with apparent lack of interest. He had a large manual fire bell which he would wind and sound purportedly to attract the audience's attention after an act, with various notices from "the Committee" (that is, the officials of the social club of which he was chairman), usually misdemeanours by the club's members or the committee itself:

On New Year's Eve a special episode of Wheeltappers and Shunters New Year's Eve would be broadcast.

Acts
The show featured acts regularly seen on the Northern club circuits and often well-established performers who did well in theatres and clubs but did not succeed so well on British television, such as 1950s crooner Johnnie Ray. But it also gave newer acts their first television exposure, such as Cannon & Ball, the Grumbleweeds, the Dooleys and Paul Daniels. Some artists to appear on the show were:

 Winifred Atwell
 Alvin Stardust
 The Bachelors
 Brotherhood of Man
 Bill Haley and His Comets
 The Dubliners
 Jim Bowen
 Frank Carson
 David Copperfield
 Design
 Stuart Damon
 The Three Degrees
 Lonnie Donegan
 Karl Denver
 Freddie Garrity
 Buddy Greco
 Kathy Kirby
 The Krankies
 Susan Maughan
 George Melly and John Chilton's Feetwarmers
 Nana Mouskouri
 Roy Orbison
 Lyn Paul
 Terri Rogers
 George Roper
 Tessie O'Shea
 Malcolm Roberts
 The Kaye Sisters
 The Dooleys
 Gene Pitney
 Lena Zavaroni
 Dukes and Lee
 Paul Daniels

The show was produced by Johnnie Hamp at Granada Studios in Manchester, although it was once filmed at the Layton Institute, Blackpool.

Actress Elizabeth Dawn appeared as a waitress before she became more famous for her role as Vera Duckworth in Coronation Street (also recorded by Granada in Manchester).

A clip from the show can be seen in the film 24 Hour Party People, where Shaun Ryder, in his formative years, is seen watching Karl Denver perform "The Lion Sleeps Tonight" ("Wimoweh").

The music video to Noel Gallagher's High Flying Birds' single "Black Star Dancing" depicts the band performing on the show.

Origins of the name

Wheeltappers and shunters are railway workers. They were commonly employed by steam railways in Britain and elsewhere, but are still found both on British railways and in Eastern Europe.

Although often called "working men's clubs", most such clubs admitted the wives and other women family of the working man, at least some days of the week. This is echoed in the programme's audience being as much female as male.

Episode guide

Series 1
 
Episode 01: Original Air Date—13 April 1974
Episode 02: Original Air Date—20 April 1974
Episode 03: Original Air Date—27 April 1974
Episode 04: Original Air Date—4 May 1974
Episode 05: Original Air Date—11 May 1974
Episode 06: Original Air Date—18 May 1974
Episode 07: Original Air Date—25 May 1974

Series 2

Episode 08: Original Air Date—27 July 1974
Episode 09: Original Air Date—3 August 1974
Episode 10: Original Air Date—10 August 1974
Episode 11: Original Air Date—17 August 1974
Episode 12: Original Air Date—24 August 1974
Episode 13: Original Air Date—31 August 1974
Episode 14: Original Air Date—7 September 1974
Special:
Episode 15: Original Air Date—31 December 1974
 
Series 3

Episode 16: Original Air Date—15 February 1975
Episode 17: Original Air Date—22 February 1975
Episode 18: Original Air Date—1 March 1975
Episode 19: Original Air Date—8 March 1975
Episode 20: Original Air Date—15 March 1975
Episode 21: Original Air Date—22 March 1975
Episode 22: Original Air Date—29 March 1975
Episode 23: Original Air Date—5 April 1975

Series 4

Episode 24: Original Air Date—19 July 1975
Episode 25: Original Air Date—26 July 1975
Episode 26: Original Air Date—2 August 1975
Episode 27: Original Air Date—9 August 1975
Episode 28: Original Air Date—16 August 1975
Episode 29: Original Air Date—23 August 1975
Episode 30: Original Air Date—30 August 1975
Special:
Episode 31: Original Air Date—31 December 1975
 
Series 5

Episode 32: Original Air Date—15 May 1976
Episode 33: Original Air Date—22 May 1976
Episode 34: Original Air Date—29 May 1976
Episode 35: Original Air Date—5 June 1976
Episode 36: Original Air Date—12 June 1976
Episode 37: Original Air Date—19 June 1976
Episode 38: Original Air Date—26 June 1976
Special:
Episode 39: Original Air Date—23 February 1977
 
Series 6

Episode 40: Original Air Date—14 April 1977
Episode 41: Original Air Date—21 April 1977
Episode 42: Original Air Date—28 April 1977
Episode 43: Original Air Date—5 May 1977
Episode 44: Original Air Date—12 May 1977
Episode 45: Original Air Date—19 May 1977
Episode 46: Original Air Date—26 May 1977
Episode 47: Original Air Date—2 June 1977
Episode 48: Original Air Date—9 June 1977

The series was, for at least part of its run, confined to a midnight slot by London Weekend Television and Southern Television, who felt it did not suit their, perceived, more upmarket demographics.

DVD releases 

The complete first series of The Wheeltappers and Shunters Social Club was released on DVD in September 2009 and the second series (including the New Year's Eve Special) was released in July 2010 with the complete third and fourth series being released in February and June 2011. The complete fifth series was released on 23 April 2012. The complete sixth (and final) series is now available as well. The format for the sixth series has changed, each episode being 30 minutes with just one major performer in each.

See also
 Musikantenstadl

References

External links

ITV comedy
1974 British television series debuts
1977 British television series endings
1970s British comedy television series
Television series by ITV Studios
Television shows produced by Granada Television
English-language television shows